Archibald K. Gardner (December 3, 1867 – January 21, 1962) was a United States circuit judge of the United States Court of Appeals for the Eighth Circuit.

Education and career

Gardner was born in Owen Sound, Ontario, Canada. In 1892, he received an Artium Baccalaureus degree from the University of Iowa in Iowa City, Iowa. The following year, he procured a Bachelor of Laws from the University of Iowa College of Law. From 1893 to 1895, he was engaged in the private practice of law in  Greenfield in Dade County in southwestern Missouri. From 1895 to 1897, he practiced in Rapid City, South Dakota, where he was the city attorney from 1897 until 1904. He was thereafter from 1907 to 1929 the general attorney for the South Dakota division of the Chicago and North Western Transportation Company.

Federal judicial service

Gardner was nominated by President Herbert Hoover on April 18, 1929, to the United States Court of Appeals for the Eighth Circuit, to a new seat authorized by 45 Stat. 1346. He was confirmed by the United States Senate on May 23, 1929, and received his commission the same day. He was a member of the Conference of Senior Circuit Judges (now the Judicial Conference of the United States) from 1947 to 1948, and a member of the Judicial Conference of the United States from 1948 to 1959. He served as Chief Judge from 1948 to 1959. He assumed senior status on September 30, 1960. His service terminated on January 21, 1962, due to his death in Huron, Beadle County in eastern South Dakota.

Assignment of Judge Davies to the Eastern District of Arkansas

In 1957, Gardner assigned Ronald Davies of North Dakota to preside over the United States District Court for the Eastern District of Arkansas in Little Rock, Arkansas. It was Davies whose orders led to the Little Rock Integration Crisis in which then Governor Orval Faubus made a vain attempt to stop the desegregation of Central High School in the Arkansas capital city.

References

Sources
 

1867 births
1962 deaths
University of Iowa alumni
South Dakota lawyers
Judges of the United States Court of Appeals for the Eighth Circuit
United States court of appeals judges appointed by Herbert Hoover
20th-century American judges
People from Owen Sound
South Dakota Republicans
People from Rapid City, South Dakota
People from Greenfield, Missouri
People from Huron, South Dakota
Canadian emigrants to the United States